Statistics of the USFSA Football Championship in the 1908 season.

Tournament

First round
 FC Lyon 3-1 Stade Grenoblois
 Racing Club Angevin - Stade Nantais Université Club

Second round  
SC Nîmes 2-5 Olympique de Marseille 
 Stade Raphaëlois 2-1 FC Lyon
 Stade Bordelais UC 2-4 Stade Olympien Vélo Club de Toulouse
 Amiens SC 2-0 Racing Club de Reims

Third round  
Cercle des Sports Stade Lorrain 3-2 Amiens SC 
Stade Olympien Véto Sport Toulousain 18-0 SVA Jarnac
Olympique de Marseille 4-0 Stade Raphaëlois
Stade rennais - Racing Club Angevin (Angers forfeited)

Quarterfinals  
Olympique de Marseille 3-0 Stade Olympien Vélo Club de Toulouse
 RC France 1-3 Cercle des Sports Stade Lorrain 
RC Roubaix 4-2 Union Athlétique du Lycée Malherbe
Le Havre Sports 2-1 Stade rennais

Semifinals  
Olympique de Marseille 1-2 RC France 
RC Roubaix 4-0 Le Havre Sports

Final  
RC Roubaix 2-1 RC France

References
RSSF

USFSA Football Championship
1
France